Siege of Grol (Groenlo)  may refer to:
 The capture of Grol (Groenlo) in 1580 by Count Rennenberg (first Spanish occupation)
 The Siege of Grol (Groenlo) in 1595 by Maurice of Orange (unsuccessful)
 The Siege of Grol (Groenlo) in 1597 by Maurice of Orange
 The first Siege of Grol (Groenlo) in 1606, by Ambrogio Spinola
 The second Siege of Grol (Groenlo) in 1606, by Maurice of Orange (unsuccessful)
 The Siege of Grol (Groenlo) in 1627 by Frederick Henry
 The Siege of Grol (Groenlo) in 1672 by Bernhard von Galen, prince-bishop of Münster
 The Slag om Grolle, the reenactment of the 1627 Siege, held every few years